were female relatives of the Japanese emperor (termed saiō) who served as High Priestesses in Kamo Shrine. Saiin princesses were usually elected from royalty (内親王, naishinnō) or princess (女王, joō). In principle, Saiin remained unmarried, but there were exceptions. Some Saiin became consorts of the Emperor, called Nyōgo in Japanese. The Saiin order of priestesses existed throughout the Heian and Kamakura periods.

Saiin is also the name given to the palace where the Saiin Priestesses lived and served the Shinto deities.

Saiin in Literature 

In The Tale of Genji, a famous work of Japanese literature, there is a story about a man named Hikaru Genji who yearned for a Saiin Princess named Asagao, but Asagao maintained a platonic relationship with Genji.

The 11th century story Sagoromo Monogatari tells the story of an unrequited love between the protagonist and Genji no Miya, who later becomes the Kamo Saiin.

Historical Saiin

Princess Shikishi (式子内親王) 
Princess Shikishi (Shikishi Naishinnō), 3rd daughter of Emperor Go-Shirikawa and Fujiwara no Seishi, was appointed High Priestess of Kamo shrine in 1159, at the age of six.  She resigned her position in 1169 due to illness. After her resignation Shikishi went on to become an accomplished poet. 399 of her poems remain in existence today.

List of Saiin
 810-831 Princess Uchiko(有智子内親王) (807-847), daughter of Emperor Saga
 831-833 Princess Tokiko(時子内親王) (?-847), daughter of Emperor Ninmyō
 833-850 Princess Takaiko(高子内親王) (?-866), daughter of Emperor Ninmyō
 850-857 Princess Akirakeiko(慧子内親王) (?-881), daughter of Emperor Montoku
 857-858 Princess Jutsushi(述子内親王) (?-897), daughter of Emperor Montoku
 859-876 Princess Gishi(儀子内親王) (?-879), daughter of Emperor Montoku
 877-880 Princess Atsuko(敦子内親王) (?-930), daughter of Emperor Seiwa
 882-887 Princess Bokushi(穆子内親王) (?-903), daughter of Emperor Kōkō
 889-892 Princess Naoiko(直子女王) (?-892), daughter of Prince Korehiko
 893-902 Princess Kimiko(君子内親王) (?-902), daughter of Emperor Uda
 903-915 Princess Kyōshi(恭子内親王) (902-915), daughter of Emperor Daigo
 915-920 Princess Nobuko(宣子内親王) (902-920), daughter of Emperor Daigo
 921-930 Princess Shōshi(韶子内親王) (918-980), daughter of Emperor Daigo
 931-967 Princess Enshi(婉子内親王) (904-969), daughter of Emperor Daigo
 968-975 Princess Sonshi(尊子内親王) (966-985), daughter of Emperor Reizei
 975-1031 Princess Senshi(選子内親王) (964-1035), daughter of Emperor Murakami
 1031-1036 Princess Kaoruko(馨子内親王) (1029-1093), daughter of Emperor Go-Ichijō
 1036-1045 Princess Kenshi(娟子内親王) (1032-1103), daughter of Emperor Go-Suzaku
 1046-1058 Princess Baishi(禖子内親王) (1039-1096), daughter of Emperor Go-Suzaku
 1058-1069 Princess Shōshi(正子内親王) (1045-1114), daughter of Emperor Go-Suzaku
 1069-1072 Princess Yoshiko(佳子内親王) (1057-1130), daughter of Emperor Go-Sanjō
 1073 Princess Atsuko(篤子内親王) (1060-1114), daughter of Emperor Go-Sanjō
 1074-1089 Princess Seishi(斉子内親王), daughter of Ko-Ichijo In(Prince Atsuakira)
 1089-1099 Princess Reishi(令子内親王) (1078-1144), daughter of Emperor Shirakawa
 1099-1107 Princess Shinshi(禛子内親王) (1081-1156), daughter of Emperor Shirakawa
 1108-1123 Princess Kanshi(官子内親王) (1090-?), daughter of Emperor Shirakawa
 1123-1126 Princess Sōshi(悰子内親王) (1099-1162), daughter of Emperor Horikawa
 1127-1132 Princess Muneko (統子内親王) (1126-1189), daughter of Emperor Toba
 1132-1133 Princess Yoshiko(禧子内親王) (1122-1133), daughter of Emperor Toba
 1133-1159 Princess Ishi(怡子女王), daughter of Prince Sukehito
 1159-1169 Princess Shikishi(式子内親王) (1149-1201), daughter of Emperor Go-Shirakawa
 1169-1171 Princess Zenshi(僐子内親王) (1159-1171), daughter of Emperor Nijō
 1171 Princess Shōshi(頌子内親王) (1145-1208), daughter of Emperor Toba
 1178-1181 Princess Noriko(範子内親王) (1177-1210), daughter of Emperor Takakura
 1204-1212 Princess Reishi(礼子内親王) (1200-1272), daughter of Emperor Go-Toba.

See also 
 Saiō
 Kamo Shrine
 Ise Grand Shrine

 Saikū

Notes

References
 Ponsonby-Fane, Richard Arthur Brabazon. (1962).   Studies in Shinto and Shrines. Kyoto: Ponsonby Memorial Society. OCLC 399449
 . (1963).  Vicissitudes of Shinto. Kyoto: Ponsonby Memorial Society. OCLC 36655

History of religion in Japan
History of Kyoto
Ancient Japanese priestesses
History of Shinto